Gabriele Leone (born Naples c. 1735 – 1790) was an Italian musician and composer who lived in Paris during the middle and later part of the 18th century. A virtuoso on the violin and mandolin, he wrote an early mandolin method, Analytical method for mastering the violin or the mandolin in 1768 and composed for both instruments. He was an early teacher of the duo method, an advanced technique which would reappear in the 20th century, taught by Giuseppe Pettine in the United States.

In the 1700s, the mandolin spread across Europe for the first time, through performances by masters of the instrument. Leone was one of those early masters who spread the mandolin in Europe, giving concerts and teaching. He spent time in London (1762–1763) as director of the London Opera before returning to Paris where he performed at the Concert Spirituel from 1760 to 1766. One of his students was Louis Philippe II, Duke of Orléans, the father of King Louis Philippe I (the last French king).

Works

He referred to himself on the covers of his works as Mr Leone de Naple (Monsieur Leone of Naples).

His mandolin method was meant to help students of the violin switch to the mandolin, "from bow to feather" without the need for a teacher, using sheet music marked with "conventional signs" to guide learners.  Feathers were used as plectrums in that era, as they had been when playing the mandore. The method contained 26 dancing tunes, 6 minuets, 2 duos, a sonata and some airs.

Books
1768, Paris, Méthode raisonnée pour passer du Violon à la Mandoline (Analytical method for mastering the violin or the mandolin)

Music
1767, Paris, 6 Sonates pour mandoline et basse continue, Livre 1 opus 1  (6 Sonatas for mandolin and basso continuo, Book 1 opus 1)
1770, Paris and Lyon, Six sonates de mandoline et basse marquées des signes suivant la nouvelle méthode opus 2 (Six sonatas of mandolin and bass marked with signs according to the new method opus 2)
1772, Paris, [6] Duo pour deux violons qui peuvent se jouer sur la mandoline et sur le par-dessus [de viole] (6 Duets for two violins that can be played on the mandolin and descant [viol])

Recordings
2015 Leone: Six sonates pour la mandoline et basse, Livre I, played by Maria Lucia Barros, Florentino Calvo, Ana Yepes

References

External links
6 Violin or Mandolin Duets sheet music
Analytical method for mastering the violin or the mandolin in French
Discussion of English transcription of Leone's method.

Italian Baroque composers
Italian violinists
Italian classical mandolinists
18th-century Italian composers
18th-century Italian male musicians
1730s births
1790 deaths